This page is a list of all the matches that Portugal national football team has played between 1940 and 1959.

External links
Portugal: Fixtures and Results – FIFA.com
Seleção A Jogos e Resultados FPF
Portugal national football team match results
Portugal – International Results

1940s in Portugal
1950s in Portugal
Portugal national football team results